Bristol is an unincorporated community in southern Pike Township, Perry County, Ohio, United States.  It lies along State Route 93 at its intersection with Marietta Road and Township Road 223.  It is located 4 miles (6 kilometers) south of New Lexington, the county seat of Perry County.

Bristol was originally called Burlington, and under the latter name was laid out in 1816. A post office called Britol was established in 1820.

References

Unincorporated communities in Perry County, Ohio
Unincorporated communities in Ohio
1816 establishments in Ohio
Populated places established in 1816